Betty Boop's May Party is a 1933 Fleischer Studios animated short film starring Betty Boop, and featuring Koko the Clown and Bimbo.

Plot

An elephant punctures a rubber tree, whose spraying sap turns the whole town rubbery.  Betty and the gang use their newfound limberness to dance and sing.

In the film, Betty sings "Here We Are", written by Harry Warren and Gus Kahn.

References

External links
Betty Boop's May Party on YouTube
Betty Boop's May Party at IMDB
Betty Boop's May Party at the Big Cartoon Database

1933 films
Betty Boop cartoons
1930s American animated films
American black-and-white films
1933 animated films
Paramount Pictures short films
Fleischer Studios short films
Short films directed by Dave Fleischer